Alister Martin (born 15 January 1965) is an Irish cyclist. He competed in the men's cross-country mountain biking event at the 1996 Summer Olympics.

References

External links
 

1965 births
Living people
Irish male cyclists
Olympic cyclists of Ireland
Cyclists at the 1996 Summer Olympics
People from Dungannon